The Koorie Heritage Trust is an Indigenous not-for-profit cultural organisation based in Melbourne. It holds over 100,000 items in its collection from paintings and artefacts through to books, videos and photographs. It has "...a commitment to protect, preserve and promote the living culture of the Indigenous people of south-east Australia." The Koorie Heritage Trust also runs a variety of cultural educational programs and a Koorie family history service.

History 
The Koorie Heritage Trust was established in 1985 when Uncle Jim Berg, Ron Castan, and Ron Merkel sued the University of Melbourne and the Museum of Victoria for the return of their collections of Indigenous cultural material. They wanted to ensure that the Indigenous community had access to their cultural heritage material.

Location 
The Koorie Heritage Trust is located in Federation Square, Melbourne, Australia.

External links 
Koorie Heritage Trust website

References 

Museums in Melbourne
Indigenous Australian education
Non-profit organisations based in Australia
Organizations established in 1985
1985 establishments in Australia